

 
Margaret River  is a locality in the Northern Territory of Australia located about  south-east of the territory capital of Darwin.

The locality consists of land bounded in part to the west by the Adelaide River and to the south by the Stuart Highway.  This locality is named after the Margaret River, a tributary of the Adelaide River, which runs through the locality.  Its boundaries and name were gazetted on 4 April 2007.

The 2016 Australian census which was conducted in August 2016 reports that Margaret River had ten people living within its boundaries.

Margaret River  is located within the federal division of Lingiari, the territory electoral division of Goyder and within the unincorporated areas of the Northern Territory.

References

 Places in the unincorporated areas of the Northern Territory